The 2014 Uzbekistan Super Cup was the second UzPFL-Supercup. It was contested by the winners and runners up of the 2013 Uzbek League. Bunyodkor had also the  won 2013 Uzbekistan Cup. The match was contested by Bunyodkor and Lokomotiv Tashkent, at JAR Stadium in Tashkent, on 7 March 2014. Bunyodkor Tashkent won the match 2:1.

Match details

References

External links
Uzbek League
PFL.uz: Standings and Results

SuperCup
2014